Laćarak is a village located in the municipality of Sremska Mitrovica, Serbia. The settlement has a Serb ethnic majority and its population numbering 10,638 inhabitants (as of 2011 census).

Historical population
 1961: 5,902
 1971: 8,121
 1981: 9,718
 1991: 10,235
 2002: 10,893
 2011: 10,638

See also
 List of places in Serbia
 List of cities, towns and villages in Vojvodina

References

 Slobodan Ćurčić, Broj stanovnika Vojvodine, Novi Sad, 1996.

External links 

 Laćarak Internet portal
 Laćarak Forum
 Sremski Oglasi

 

Populated places in Syrmia
Sremska Mitrovica